Alex Candelario (born February 26, 1975) is an American former professional cyclist. After retiring from cycling, Candelario formed Big Island Bike Tours, a bicycle touring company on the island of Hawaii.

Major results

2003
 1st Stage 6 Cascade Cycling Classic
2004
 1st Stage 4 Redlands Bicycle Classic
 1st Stage 6 Cascade Cycling Classic
2005
 1st Stage 17 International Cycling Classic
 1st Stage 4 Tour de Nez
2006
 International Cycling Classic
1st Stages 16 & 17
2007
 1st Overall Tour de Nez
1st Stage 1
2008
 2nd Criterium, National Road Championships
 3rd Overall U.S. Air Force Classic
2010
 2nd Road race, National Road Championships
 3rd Overall Bucks County Classic
2012
 2nd Overall Tour de Korea
1st Stage 2

References

External links

1975 births
Living people
American male cyclists
Sportspeople from the Las Vegas Valley